Soundtracker may refer to:
Ultimate Soundtracker: a music tracker program for the Commodore Amiga
SoundTracker (Unix): a music tracker program for Unix-like operating systems
Soundtracker (ZX Spectrum): a music tracker program for the ZX Spectrum
Soundtracker (music streaming): a music streaming platform for mobile devices